Lydia Lamaison (5 August 1914 – 20 February 2012) was an Argentine actress. She appeared in 47 films and television shows between 1939 and 2012. She starred in the film La caída, which was entered into the 9th Berlin International Film Festival.

Selected filmography
 Alas de mi patria (1939)
 La Caída (1959)
 Fin de fiesta (1960)
 Un Guapo del '900 (1960)
 The Romance of a Gaucho (1961)
 The Last Floor (1962)
 Circe (1964)
 El Ayudante (1971)
 Muñeca brava (1998)
 La puta y la ballena (2004)

References

External links

1914 births
2012 deaths
Argentine film actresses
Burials at La Chacarita Cemetery
People from Mendoza, Argentina
Illustrious Citizens of Buenos Aires
20th-century Argentine actresses